Scarlet is a 2022 internationally co-produced drama film, directed by Pietro Marcello, from a screenplay by Marcello, Maurizio Braucci, Maud Amelin, and Geneviève Brisac. It is loosely based on Scarlet Sails by Alexander Grin. It stars Raphaël Thierry, Juliette Jouan, Louis Garrel, Noémie Lvovsky, Ernst Umhauer, François Négret and Yolande Moreau.

It had its world premiere at the 2022 Cannes Film Festival on 18 May 2022, in the Directors Fortnight section.

Cast
 Raphaël Thierry as Raphaël
 Juliette Jouan as Juliette
 Louis Garrel as Jean
 Noémie Lvovsky as Adeline
 Ernst Umhauer
 François Négret
 Yolande Moreau as The magician

Production
In April 2021, it was announced Juliette Jouan, Raphaël Thierry, Louis Garrel, and Noémie Lvovsky had joined the cast of the film, with Pietro Marcello directing from a screenplay he wrote, with Arte set to produce. In August 2021, Ernst Umhauer, François Négret and Yolande Moreau joined the cast of the film.

Principal photography began in August 2021.

Release
It had its world premiere at the 2022 Cannes Film Festival on 18 May 2022, in the Directors Fortnight section. The film was invited in Gala Presentation section of 27th Busan International Film Festival to be screened in October 2022.

References

External links
 

2022 films
French drama films
Italian drama films
German drama films
Russian drama films
Films scored by Gabriel Yared
2022 drama films
2020s French films